Belstead Brook Division, Suffolk is an electoral division in Babergh District, Suffolk which returns a single County Councillor to Suffolk County Council. It comprises two wards, Brook and Pinewood.

Parishes 
The following parishes are in the Belstead Brook Division.
 Belstead
 Burstall
 Chattisham
 Copdock and Washbrook
 Hintlesham
 Pinewood
 Sproughton
 Wherstead

References

Electoral Divisions of Suffolk